Baba Sy was an African international draughts player and the first world champion from Africa.

He is said to have been "discovered" by an American player visiting Dakar in 1959.

In 1962 Germany organized a "big game/party", he was the only Senegalese and only African. He played against 150 players simultaneously spending few seconds per table. Several champions are part of the "big game/party" and he is declared the winner. By some accounts he is said to have beat each of the  150 players, in other accounts the results were 122 wins, 33 draws, and 5 loses. In either case, a remarkable achievement.

During the 1963–64 World Championship, a controversial dispute arose between him and Iser Kuperman, and the final match was not played. The championship title for this competition remained unresolved at the time of Baba Sy's death (car accident) in 1978. He was posthumously declared the victor in 1986. The matter caused some debate over the years.

He is sometimes seen as a pioneer who paved the way for other African players.

Publications
 Ton Sijbrands: Le grand livre de Baba Sy = Het groot Baba Sy boek. Voorst, 1989. 
 Govert Westerveld: Baba Sy, the World Champion of 1963-1964 of 10×10 Draughts -  Volume I. Blanca, 2015. 
 Govert Westerveld: Baba Sy, the World Champion of 1963-1964 of 10×10 Draughts-  Volume II. Blanca, 2015.

External links
Official site for Baba Sy on a French language checkers site
The Chess Drum
The Chess Drum

1935 births
Senegalese draughts players
Road incident deaths in Senegal
1978 deaths
1978 road incidents
Players of international draughts